Farouk Osman Hamadallah (unknown – 1971) was a Sudanese General and politician. Hamadallah was a member of the Sudanese Free Officers Movement, and took part in the 1969 coup which brought Nimeiry, and the National Revolutionary Command Council, to power. Hamdallah would initially serve in the NRCC, although Hamdallah, along with Hashem al Atta and Babikir al-Nur Osman were later purged from the Council in 1970. Hamadallah was executed for his role in the failed 1971 coup against Nimeiry.

References

Date of birth missing
1971 deaths
Sudanese generals
People executed by Sudan